The Democratic Revolutionary Youth Federation is the youth wing of Communist Party of Revolutionary Marxists in India.

Youth wings of communist parties of India